Oulad Nami or Ouled Nami (also spelled Na'mi;  nāmi) is a wadi in Morocco and is nearby to Dar Caïd Nami, Dra el Krem and Mabda. It has an average elevation of 174 metres above sea level.

References 

Rivers of Morocco
International rivers of Africa
Nami